The Smt K A Vora Primary School in Ranasan Town in Talod in Sabarkantha is one of the oldest public school in India.

See also 
 Ranasan
 List of the oldest schools in the world

External links 
 Facebook Page

Schools in Gujarat
Sabarkantha district